The Latin America and Caribbean Federation for Internet and Electronic Commerce (eCOM-LAC) was founded in March 1988 at a meeting held in Rio de Janeiro.

Objective
The Federation´s Mission Statement is to promote development of ICTs in the Latin America and Caribbean region, support initiatives that reduce the digital divide in this geographical area, and represent the ICT private sector of this region in the corresponding international fora, such as:

 WSIS – World Summit of the Information Society
 IGF – Internet Governance Forum
 ICANN - Internet Corporation for Assigned Names and Numbers
 LACNIC – Latin American and Caribbean Internet Addresses Registry

History
eCOM-LAC organized two regional electronic commerce summits, the first in São Paulo (March 2000), and the second in Buenos Aires (April 2001). Amongst the keynote speakers who participated, we can highlight the presence of Mr. Donald Evans, U.S.Secretary of Commerce, at the Buenos Aires summit.

eCOM-LAC was a founder of LACNIC, the Latin American and Caribbean Internet Addresses Registry, which was formally established in late 2003, after four years of negotiations with ICANN to obtain approval for this initiative. This was a genuine Muiltisector Partnership which included participation of the private, academic, NGO and Civil Society sectors in the region. The “deliverable” was a non-profit entity, with policies defined by the regional Internet community, and which manages the IP address blocks for Latin America from its headquarters in Montevideo (Uruguay).

In the years 2004/2005, eCOM-LAC was part of an International Consortium, led by the Fundació Applicació of Barcelona (Spain), which was awarded a 3.000.000 Euros subsidy by the European Commission, through the @lis RFP. The project that was implemented was titled: ATLAS de la Diversidad – Mi Lugar, and approximately four hundred schools in Latin America received instruction in the use of website development and publishing tools, and simultaneously creating a network of schools that were able to share their customs, culture, music, history, etc. eCOM-LAC was tasked with provisioning broadband connectivity for the underprivileged schools that lacked resources. The Consortium paid for these costs during the duration of the project (24 months).

Executive Board
President: Oscar Messano (CABASE)
Vice President: Eduardo Parajo (ABRANET)
Secretary: Osvaldo Novoa (ANTel)
Treasurer: José Pedro Derrégibus (CNCS)

Members
ABRANET – Associação Brasileira dos Provedores de Accesso, Serviços e Informações da Rede
ANTEL – Administración Nacional de Telecomunicaciones (Uruguay)

ASSESPRO – Associação das Empresas Brasileiras de Tecnologia da Informação
CABASE – Cámara Argentina de Bases de Datos y Servicios en Línea
CANADECO – Cámara Nacional de Comercio y Servicios del Uruguay
Intersys (Uruguay)

eCOM-LAC's cooperation agreements
In 2006, eCOM-LAC became a member of Global Knowledge Partnership (GKP), a global entity that focuses on sharing knowledge and building partnerships, for ICT4D and poverty reduction worldwide. In April 2008, eCOM-LAC was elected as GKP Regional Coordinator for Latin America and the Caribbean.

.lat domain initiative
The Internet continues growing day by day. Internet users need to identify and differentiate themselves, even beyond their region, to reflect their identity in their cultural, social and business activities.

The DNS through the TLDs continues providing unique identification to machines, services and internet users on the Web. This identification is traditionally associated with its country of origin or its prime activity like commerce, education and government.

Users need choice. In response to this need, in recent years we have seen the emergence of some new top-level domains such as: ‘.biz’, ‘.info’, ‘.name’, ‘.travel’, ‘.mobi’, and significantly the regional identity TLDs – ‘.eu’, and ‘.asia’ and cultural identity TLDs like ".cat". These two latter domains, which are enjoying significant success, provide registrants with an option to register domain names establishing a regional or cultural identity on the Internet, as compared for example, to national identity by registering their domain names under a country code top-level domain.

To give Latin-American and Caribbean individuals and organizations from all over the world a new choice to identify themselves with the rest of the internet, eCOM-LAC in partnership with NIC Mexico, applied for delegation of a new top-level domain – ‘.lat’. This TLD was launched in 2019.

External links
ecomlac.lat (official site)
www.globalknowledge.org
ABRANET
ANTEL

ASSESPRO
CABASE
CANADECO

Intersys

Internet governance
Information and communication technologies for development